Mozabite (endonym: tamazight), also known as Mzab, Tumẓabt or Ghardaia, is a Zenati language spoken by the Mozabites, an Ibadi Berber group inhabiting the seven cities of the M'zab natural region in the northern Saharan Algeria. It is also spoken by small numbers of Mozabite emigrants in other local cities and elsewhere. Mozabites also use Algerian Arabic. As of 2010, UNESCO estimated there to be about 150,000 Mozabite speakers. 

Mozabite is one of the Mzab–Wargla languages, a dialect cluster of the Zenati languages.

Bibliography
 ابراهيم و بكير عبد السلام. الوجيز في قواعد الكتابة و النحو للغة الأمازيغية "المزابية". المطبعة العرببة: غرداية 1996.
  Delheure, Jean. Aǧraw n Yiwalen Tumẓabt d-Tefṛansist = Dictionnaire Mozabite–Francais. SELAF:Paris 1984.

References

External links
 Aghlan
 dictionary

Zenati languages
Languages of Algeria
Ghardaïa Province